Myralyn “Mimi” Nartey (née Osei-Agyemang, born 5 November 1981) is an American-born Ghanaian former footballer who played as a forward. She has represented the Ghana women's national team.

International career
Although raised in Portland, Oregon, she qualified to represent Ghana through her father, Simon Osei-Agyemang. She made her international debut in 1998, aged 16, and became the first one who was born outside Ghana. She was part of the team at the 2003 FIFA Women's World Cup.

Personal life
She currently lives in Playa Vista, Los Angeles with her husband Kofi Nartey and their two children. Her younger sister, Candice Osei-Agyemang, represented Ghana at the 2012 FIFA U-20 Women's World Cup.

References

1981 births
Living people
2003 FIFA Women's World Cup players
African-American women's soccer players
American sportspeople of Ghanaian descent
American women's soccer players
Citizens of Ghana through descent
Ghana women's international footballers
Ghanaian women's footballers
Place of birth missing (living people)
Women's association football forwards
Ghanaian expatriate women's footballers
21st-century African-American sportspeople
21st-century African-American women
20th-century African-American people
20th-century African-American women